The Iron Age is the final epoch of the three-age division of the prehistory and protohistory of humanity. It was preceded by the Stone Age (Paleolithic, Mesolithic, Neolithic) and the Bronze Age. The concept has been mostly applied to Iron Age Europe and the Ancient Near East, but also, by analogy, to other parts of the Old World.

The duration of the Iron Age varies depending on the region under consideration. It is defined by archaeological convention. The "Iron Age" begins locally when the production of iron or steel has advanced to the point where iron tools and weapons replace their bronze equivalents in common use. In the Ancient Near East, this transition took place in the wake of the Bronze Age collapse, in the 12th century BC. The technology soon spread throughout the Mediterranean Basin region and to South Asia (Iron Age in India) between the 12th and 11th century BC. Its further spread to Central Asia, Eastern Europe, and Central Europe is somewhat delayed, and Northern Europe was not reached until around the start of the 5th century BC.

The Iron Age is taken to end, also by convention, with the beginning of the historiographical record.
This usually does not represent a clear break in the archaeological record; for the Ancient Near East, the establishment of the Achaemenid Empire c. 550 BC is traditionally and still usually taken as a cut-off date, later dates being considered historical by virtue of the record by Herodotus, despite considerable written records from far earlier (well back into the Bronze Age) now being known. In Central and Western Europe, the Roman conquests of the 1st century BC serve as marking for the end of the Iron Age. The Germanic Iron Age of Scandinavia is taken to end c. 800 AD, with the beginning of the Viking Age.

In the Indian sub-continent, the Iron Age is taken to begin with the ironworking Painted Gray Ware culture. Recent estimates suggest that it ranges from the 15th century BC, through to the reign of Ashoka in the 3rd century BC. The use of the term "Iron Age" in the archaeology of South, East, and Southeast Asia is more recent and less common than for Western Eurasia. In China, written history started before iron-working arrived, so the term is infrequently used.

History of the concept
The time and context of this Iron Age era varied by geography or country. Please note that classically, it is said that this era occurred in the 12th century BC. 

The three-age method was first used for the archaeology of Europe during the first half of the 19th century, and by the latter half of  the 19th century it had been extended to the archaeology of the Ancient Near East. Its name harks back to the mythological "Ages of Man" of Hesiod. As an archaeological era, it was first introduced for Scandinavia by Christian Jürgensen Thomsen in the 1830s. By the 1860s, it was embraced as a useful division of the "earliest history of mankind" in general and began to be applied in Assyriology. The development of the now-conventional periodization in the archaeology of the Ancient Near East was developed in the 1920s to 1930s.
As its name suggests, Iron Age technology is characterized by the production of tools and weaponry by ferrous metallurgy (ironworking), more specifically from carbon steel.

Chronology

Increasingly the Iron Age in Europe is being seen as a part of the Bronze Age collapse in the ancient Near East, in ancient India (with the post-Rigvedic Vedic civilization), ancient Iran, and ancient Greece (with the Greek Dark Ages). In other regions of Europe the Iron Age began in the 8th century BC in Central Europe and the 6th century BC in Northern Europe. The Near Eastern Iron Age is divided into two subsections, Iron I and Iron II. Iron I (1200–1000 BC) illustrates both continuity and discontinuity with the previous Late Bronze Age. There is no definitive cultural break between the 13th and 12th centuries BC throughout the entire region, although certain new features in the hill country, Transjordan and coastal region may suggest the appearance of the Aramaean and Sea People groups. There is evidence, however, of strong continuity with Bronze Age culture, although as one moves later into Iron Age the culture begins to diverge more significantly from that of the late 2nd millennium.

The Iron Age as an archaeological period is roughly defined as that part of the prehistory of a culture or region during which ferrous metallurgy was the dominant technology of metalworking.

The characteristic of an Iron Age culture is the mass production of tools and weapons made from steel, typically alloys with a carbon content between approximately 0.30% and 1.2% by weight. Only with the capability of the production of carbon steel does ferrous metallurgy result in tools or weapons that are equal or superior to bronze. The use of steel has been based as much on economics as on metallurgical advancements. Early steel was made by smelting iron.

By convention, the Iron Age in the Ancient Near East is taken to last from c. 1200 BC (the Bronze Age collapse) to c. 550 BC (or 539 BC), roughly the beginning of historiography with Herodotus; the end of the proto-historical period. In Central and Western Europe, the Iron Age is taken to last from c. 800 BC to c. 1 BC, in Northern Europe from c. 500 BC to 800 CE.

In China, there is no recognizable prehistoric period characterized by ironworking, as Bronze Age China transitions almost directly into the Qin dynasty of imperial China; "Iron Age" in the context of China is sometimes used for the transitional period of c. 900 BC to 100 BC during which ferrous metallurgy was present even if not dominant.

Early ferrous metallurgy

The earliest-known iron artifacts are nine small beads dated to 3200 BC, which were found in burials at Gerzeh, Lower Egypt. They have been identified as meteoric iron shaped by careful hammering. Meteoric iron, a characteristic iron–nickel alloy, was used by various ancient peoples thousands of years before the Iron Age. Such iron, being in its native metallic state, required no smelting of ores.

Smelted iron appears sporadically in the archeological record from the middle Bronze Age. Whilst terrestrial iron is naturally abundant, temperatures above  are required to smelt it, placing it out of reach of commonly available technology until the end of the second millennium BC. In addition to specially designed furnaces, ancient iron production required the development of complex procedures for the removal of impurities, the regulation of the admixture of carbon, and the invention of hot-working to achieve a useful balance of hardness and strength in steel.

The earliest tentative evidence for iron-making is a small number of iron fragments with the appropriate amounts of carbon admixture found in the Proto-Hittite layers at Kaman-Kalehöyük in modern-day Turkey, dated to 2200–2000 BC. Akanuma (2008) concludes that "The combination of carbon dating, archaeological context, and archaeometallurgical examination indicates that it is likely that the use of ironware made of steel had already begun in the third millennium BC in Central Anatolia". Souckova-Siegolová (2001) shows that iron implements were made in Central Anatolia in very limited quantities around 1800 BC and were in general use by elites, though not by commoners, during the New Hittite Empire (∼1400–1200 BC).

Similarly, recent archaeological remains of iron-working in the Ganges Valley in India have been tentatively dated to 1800 BC. Tewari (2003) concludes that "knowledge of iron smelting and manufacturing of iron artifacts was well known in the Eastern Vindhyas and iron had been in use in the Central Ganga Plain, at least from the early second millennium BC". By the Middle Bronze Age increasing numbers of smelted iron objects (distinguishable from meteoric iron by the lack of nickel in the product) appeared in the Middle East, Southeast Asia and South Asia. African sites are turning up dates as early as 2000-1200 BC.

Modern archaeological evidence identifies the start of large-scale iron production in around 1200 BC, marking the end of the Bronze Age. Between 1200 BC and 1000 BC diffusion in the understanding of iron metallurgy and the use of iron objects was fast and far-flung. Anthony Snodgrass suggests that a shortage of tin, as a part of the Bronze Age Collapse and trade disruptions in the Mediterranean around 1300 BC, forced metalworkers to seek an alternative to bronze. As evidence, many bronze implements were recycled into weapons during that time. More widespread use of iron led to improved steel-making technology at a lower cost. Thus, even when tin became available again, iron was cheaper, stronger and lighter, and forged iron implements superseded cast bronze tools permanently.

Ancient Near East
The Iron Age in the Ancient Near East is believed to have begun with the discovery of iron smelting and smithing techniques in Anatolia or the Caucasus and Balkans in the late 2nd millennium BC ( 1300 BC). The earliest bloomery smelting of iron is found at Tell Hammeh, Jordan around 930 BC (determined from 14C dating).

The Early Iron Age in the Caucasus area is conventionally divided into two periods, Early Iron I, dated to around 1100 BC, and the Early Iron II phase from the tenth to ninth centuries BC. Many of the material culture traditions of the Late Bronze Age continued into the Early Iron Age. Thus, there is a sociocultural continuity during this transitional period.

In Iran, the earliest actual iron artifacts were unknown until the 9th century BC. For Iran, the best studied archaeological site during this time period is Teppe Hasanlu.

West Asia
In the Mesopotamian states of Sumer, Akkad and Assyria, the initial use of iron reaches far back, to perhaps 3000 BC. One of the earliest smelted iron artifacts known was a dagger with an iron blade found in a Hattic tomb in Anatolia, dating from 2500 BC. The widespread use of iron weapons which replaced bronze weapons rapidly disseminated throughout the Near East (North Africa, southwest Asia) by the beginning of the 1st millennium BC.

The development of iron smelting was once attributed to the Hittites of Anatolia during the Late Bronze Age.
As part of the Late Bronze Age-Early Iron Age, the Bronze Age collapse saw the slow, comparatively continuous spread of iron-working technology in the region.
It was long held that the success of the Hittite Empire during the Late Bronze Age had been based on the advantages entailed by the "monopoly" on ironworking at the time. Accordingly, the invading Sea Peoples would have been responsible for spreading the knowledge through that region.
The view of such a "Hittite monopoly" has come under scrutiny and no longer represents a scholarly consensus.
While there are some iron objects from Bronze Age Anatolia, the number is comparable to iron objects found in Egypt and other places of the same time period; and only a small number of these objects are weapons.

 

Dates are approximate, consult particular article for details
  Prehistoric (or Proto-historic) Iron Age  Historic Iron Age

Egypt

The Iron Age in Egyptian archaeology essentially corresponds to the Third Intermediate Period of Egypt.

Iron metal is singularly scarce in collections of Egyptian antiquities. Bronze remained the primary material there until the conquest by Neo-Assyrian Empire in 671 BC. The explanation of this would seem to be that the relics are in most cases the paraphernalia of tombs, the funeral vessels and vases, and iron being considered an impure metal by the ancient Egyptians it was never used in their manufacture of these or for any religious purposes. It was attributed to Seth, the spirit of evil who according to Egyptian tradition governed the central deserts of Africa.
In the Black Pyramid of Abusir, dating before 2000 BC, Gaston Maspero found some pieces of iron. In the funeral text of Pepi I, the metal is mentioned. A sword bearing the name of pharaoh Merneptah as well as a battle axe with an iron blade and gold-decorated bronze shaft were both found in the excavation of Ugarit. A dagger with an iron blade found in Tutankhamun's tomb, 13th century BC, was recently examined and found to be of meteoric origin.

Europe

In Europe, the Iron Age is the last stage of prehistoric Europe and the first of the protohistoric periods, which initially means descriptions of a particular area by Greek and Roman writers. For much of Europe, the period came to an abrupt local end after conquest by the Romans, though ironworking remained the dominant technology until recent times. Elsewhere it may last until the early centuries AD, and either Christianization or a new conquest in the Migration Period.

Iron working was introduced to Europe in the late 11th century BC, probably from the Caucasus, and slowly spread northwards and westwards over the succeeding 500 years. The Iron Age did not start when iron first appeared in Europe but it began to replace bronze in the preparation of tools and weapons. It did not happen at the same time all around Europe; local cultural developments played a role in the transition to the Iron Age. For example, the Iron Age of Prehistoric Ireland begins around 500 BC (when the Greek Iron Age had already ended) and finishes around 400 AD. The widespread use of the technology of iron was implemented in Europe simultaneously with Asia. The prehistoric Iron Age in Central Europe divided into two periods based on historical events – Hallstatt culture (early Iron Age) and La Tène (late Iron Age) cultures. Material cultures of Hallstatt and La Tène consist of 4 phases (A, B, C, D phases).

The Iron Age in Europe is characterized by an elaboration of designs in weapons, implements, and utensils. These are no longer cast but hammered into shape, and decoration is elaborate and curvilinear rather than simple rectilinear; the forms and character of the ornamentation of the northern European weapons resemble in some respects Roman arms, while in other respects they are peculiar and evidently representative of northern art.

Citania de Briterios located in Guimarães, Portugal is one of the examples of archaeological sites of the Iron Age. The site was researched by Francisco Martins Sarmento starting from 1874. A number of amphoras (containers usually for wine or olive oil), coins, fragments of pottery, weapons, pieces of jewelry, as well as ruins of a bath and its  revealed here.

Asia

Central Asia
The Iron Age in Central Asia began when iron objects appear among the Indo-European Saka in present-day Xinjiang (China) between the 10th century BC and the 7th century BC, such as those found at the cemetery site of Chawuhukou.

The Pazyryk culture is an Iron Age archaeological culture (c. 6th to 3rd centuries BC) identified by excavated artifacts and mummified humans found in the Siberian permafrost in the Altay Mountains.

East Asia

Dates are approximate, consult particular article for details
  Prehistoric (or Proto-historic) Iron Age  Historic Iron Age
In China, Chinese bronze inscriptions are found around 1200 BC, preceding the development of iron metallurgy, which was known by the 9th century BC.  Therefore, in China prehistory had given way to history periodized by ruling dynasties by the start of iron use, so "Iron Age" is not typically used as to describe a period in Chinese history. Iron metallurgy reached the Yangtse Valley toward the end of the 6th century BC. The few objects were found at Changsha and Nanjing. The mortuary evidence suggests that the initial use of iron in Lingnan belongs to the mid-to-late Warring States period (from about 350 BC). Important non-precious husi style metal finds include Iron tools found at the tomb at Guwei-cun of the 4th century BC.

The techniques used in Lingnan are a combination of bivalve moulds of distinct southern tradition and the incorporation of piece mould technology from the Zhongyuan. The products of the combination of these two periods are bells, vessels, weapons and ornaments, and the sophisticated cast.

An Iron Age culture of the Tibetan Plateau has tentatively been associated with the Zhang Zhung culture described in early Tibetan writings.

Iron objects were introduced to the Korean peninsula through trade with chiefdoms and state-level societies in the Yellow Sea area in the 4th century BC, just at the end of the Warring States Period but before the Western Han Dynasty began. Yoon proposes that iron was first introduced to chiefdoms located along North Korean river valleys that flow into the Yellow Sea such as the Cheongcheon and Taedong Rivers. Iron production quickly followed in the 2nd century BC, and iron implements came to be used by farmers by the 1st century in southern Korea. The earliest known cast-iron axes in southern Korea are found in the Geum River basin. The time that iron production begins is the same time that complex chiefdoms of Proto-historic Korea emerged. The complex chiefdoms were the precursors of early states such as Silla, Baekje, Goguryeo, and Gaya Iron ingots were an important mortuary item and indicated the wealth or prestige of the deceased in this period.

In Japan, iron items, such as tools, weapons, and decorative objects, are postulated to have entered Japan during the late Yayoi period ( 300 BC–300 AD) or the succeeding Kofun period ( 250–538 AD), most likely through contacts with the Korean Peninsula and China.

Distinguishing characteristics of the Yayoi period include the appearance of new pottery styles and the start of intensive rice agriculture in paddy fields. Yayoi culture flourished in a geographic area from southern Kyūshū to northern Honshū. The Kofun and the subsequent Asuka periods are sometimes referred to collectively as the Yamato period; The word kofun is Japanese for the type of burial mounds dating from that era.

South Asia

Dates are approximate, consult particular article for details
  Prehistoric (or Proto-historic) Iron Age  Historic Iron Age

Iron was being used in Mundigak to manufacture some items in the 3rd millennium BC such as a small copper/bronze bell with an iron clapper, a copper/bronze rod with two iron decorative buttons,. and a copper/bronze mirror handle with a decorative iron button. Artefacts including small knives and blades have been discovered in the Indian state of Telangana which have been dated between 2,400 BC and 1800 BC The history of metallurgy in the Indian subcontinent began prior to the 3rd millennium BC. Archaeological sites in India, such as Malhar, Dadupur, Raja Nala Ka Tila, Lahuradewa, Kosambi and Jhusi, Allahabad in present-day Uttar Pradesh show iron implements in the period 1800–1200 BC. As the evidence from the sites Raja Nala ka tila, Malhar suggest the use of Iron in c.1800/1700 BC. The extensive use of iron smelting is from Malhar and its surrounding area. This site is assumed as the center for smelted bloomer iron to this area due to its location in the Karamnasa River and Ganga River. This site shows agricultural technology as iron implements sickles, nails, clamps, spearheads, etc, by at least c.1500 BC. Archaeological excavations in Hyderabad show an Iron Age burial site.

The beginning of the 1st millennium BC saw extensive developments in iron metallurgy in India. Technological advancement and mastery of iron metallurgy were achieved during this period of peaceful settlements. One ironworking centre in East India has been dated to the first millennium BC. In Southern India (present-day Mysore) iron appeared as early as 12th to 11th centuries BC; these developments were too early for any significant close contact with the northwest of the country. The Indian Upanishads mention metallurgy. and the Indian Mauryan period saw advances in metallurgy. As early as 300 BC, certainly by 200 AD, high-quality steel was produced in southern India, by what would later be called the crucible technique. In this system, high-purity wrought iron, charcoal, and glass were mixed in a crucible and heated until the iron melted and absorbed the carbon.

The protohistoric Early Iron Age in Sri Lanka lasted from 1000 BC to 600 BC. Radiocarbon evidence has been collected from Anuradhapura and Aligala shelter in Sigiriya. The skeletal remains of an Early Iron Age chief were excavated in Anaikoddai, Jaffna. The name 'Ko Veta' is engraved in Brahmi script on a seal buried with the skeleton and is assigned by the excavators to the 3rd century BC. Ko, meaning "King" in Tamil, is comparable to such names as Ko Atan and Ko Putivira occurring in contemporary Brahmi inscriptions in south India. It is also speculated that Early Iron Age sites may exist in Kandarodai, Matota, Pilapitiya and Tissamaharama.

Southeast Asia

Dates are approximate, consult particular article for details
 Prehistoric (or Proto-historic) Iron Age  Historic Iron Age
Archaeology in Thailand at sites Ban Don Ta Phet and Khao Sam Kaeo yielding metallic, stone, and glass artifacts stylistically associated with the Indian subcontinent suggest Indianization of Southeast Asia beginning in the 4th to 2nd centuries BC during the late Iron Age.

In Philippines and Vietnam, the Sa Huynh culture showed evidence of an extensive trade network. Sa Huynh beads were made from glass, carnelian, agate, olivine, zircon, gold and garnet; most of these materials were not local to the region and were most likely imported. Han-Dynasty-style bronze mirrors were also found in Sa Huynh sites. Conversely, Sa Huynh produced ear ornaments have been found in archaeological sites in Central Thailand, as well as the Orchid Island.

Sub-Saharan Africa

In Sub-Saharan Africa, where there was no continent-wide universal Bronze Age, the use of iron immediately succeeded the use of stone.
Metallurgy was characterized by the absence of a Bronze Age, and the transition from stone to iron in tool substances. Early evidence for iron technology in Sub-Saharan Africa can be found at sites such as KM2 and KM3 in northwest Tanzania and parts of Nigeria and the Central African Republic. Nubia was one of the relatively few places in Africa to have a sustained Bronze Age along with Egypt and much of the rest of North Africa.

Very early copper and bronze working sites in Niger may date to as early as 1500 BC. There is also evidence of iron metallurgy in Termit, Niger from around this period.
Nubia was a major manufacturer and exporter of iron after the expulsion of the Nubian dynasty from Egypt by the Assyrians in the 7th century BC.

Though there is some uncertainty, some archaeologists believe that iron metallurgy was developed independently in sub-Saharan West Africa, separately from Eurasia and neighboring parts of North and Northeast Africa.

Archaeological sites containing iron smelting furnaces and slag have also been excavated at sites in the Nsukka region of southeast Nigeria in what is now Igboland: dating to 2000 BC at the site of Lejja (Eze-Uzomaka 2009) and to 750 BC and at the site of Opi (Holl 2009). The site of Gbabiri (in the Central African Republic) has yielded evidence of iron metallurgy, from a reduction furnace and blacksmith workshop; with earliest dates of 896-773 BC and 907-796 BC, respectively. Similarly, smelting in bloomery-type furnaces appear in the Nok culture of central Nigeria by about 550 BC and possibly a few centuries earlier.

Iron and copper working in Sub-Saharan Africa spread south and east from Central Africa in conjunction with the Bantu expansion, from the Cameroon region to the African Great Lakes in the 3rd century BC, reaching the Cape around 400 AD.
However, iron working may have been practiced in Central Africa as early as the 3rd millennium BC.
Instances of carbon steel based on complex preheating principles were found to be in production around the 1st century CE in northwest Tanzania.

Dates are approximate, consult particular article for details
  Prehistoric (or Proto-historic) Iron Age  Historic Iron Age

Image gallery

See also 

 Blast furnace
 Fogou
 Metallurgy in pre-Columbian America
 List of archaeological periods
 List of archaeological sites
 Roman metallurgy
 Jublains archeological site, an example in northwest France

References

Further reading

 Jan David Bakker, Stephan Maurer, Jörn-Steffen Pischke and Ferdinand Rauch. 2021. "Of Mice and Merchants: Connectedness and the Location of Economic Activity in the Iron Age." Review of Economics and Statistics 103 (4): 652–665.
Chang, Claudia. Rethinking Prehistoric Central Asia: Shepherds, Farmers, and Nomads. New York: Routledge, 2018.
 Collis, John. The European Iron Age. London: B.T. Batsford, 1984.
 Cunliffe, Barry W. Iron Age Britain. Rev. ed. London: Batsford, 2004.
 Davis-Kimball, Jeannine, V. A Bashilov, and L. Tiablonskiĭ. Nomads of the Eurasian Steppes in the Early Iron Age. Berkeley, CA: Zinat Press, 1995.
 Finkelstein, Israel, and Eli Piasetzky. "The Iron Age Chronology Debate: Is the Gap Narrowing?" Near Eastern Archaeology 74.1 (2011): 50–55.
 Jacobson, Esther. Burial Ritual, Gender, and Status in South Siberia in the Late Bronze–Early Iron Age. Bloomington: Indiana University, Research Institute for Inner Asian Studies, 1987.
 Mazar, Amihai. "Iron Age Chronology: A Reply to I. Finkelstein". Levant 29 (1997): 157–167.
 Mazar, Amihai. "The Iron Age Chronology Debate: Is the Gap Narrowing? Another Viewpoint". Near Eastern Archaeology 74.2 (2011): 105–110.
 Medvedskaia, I. N. Iran: Iron Age I. Oxford: B.A.R., 1982.
 Shinnie, P. L. The African Iron Age. Oxford: Clarendon Press, 1971.
 Tripathi, Vibha. The Age of Iron in South Asia: Legacy and Tradition. New Delhi: Aryan Books International, 2001.
 Waldbaum, Jane C. From Bronze to Iron: The Transition from the Bronze Age to the Iron Age in the Eastern Mediterranean. Göteborg: P. Aström, 1978.

External links
 General
 A site with a focus on Iron Age Britain  from resourcesforhistory.com
 Human Timeline (Interactive)—Smithsonian, National Museum of Natural History (August 2016).

 Publications
 Andre Gunder Frank and William R. Thompson, Early "Iron Age economic expansion and contraction revisited". American Institute of Archaeology, San Francisco, January 2004.

 News
 "Mass burial suggests massacre at Iron Age hill fort". Archaeologists have found evidence of a massacre linked to Iron Age warfare at a hill fort in Derbyshire. BBC. 17 April 2011

 
Articles which contain graphical timelines
2nd-millennium BC establishments
Historical eras